Bent Hansen (born 21 October 1932) is a Danish former cyclist. He competed in the team pursuit event at the 1964 Summer Olympics.

References

External links
 

1932 births
Living people
Danish male cyclists
Olympic cyclists of Denmark
Cyclists at the 1964 Summer Olympics
Cyclists from Copenhagen